The 1932 United States Senate elections in Colorado took place on November 8, 1932. Incumbent Republican Senator Charles W. Waterman announced that he would not seek re-election to a second term. Attorney Karl C. Schuyler won the Republican nomination to succeed Waterman and faced former Senator Alva B. Adams, the Democratic nominee, in the general election.

However, shortly before the primary elections took place, Waterman died in office. Governor Billy Adams appointed Walter Walker, the Chairman of the Colorado Democratic Party, to fill the vacancy. A special election was called for the November 8, 1932, general election to fill the remaining months of Waterman's term. The state Republican Party named Schuyler as its nominee, but Adams declined to be a candidate in the special election, and Walker was named as the nominee.

The ensuing elections produced a split result. Schuyler narrowly won the special election over Walker by about 1,000 votes, and ended up serving for several months in the Senate. However, Adams handily defeated Schuyler for the full term.

Democratic primary

Regular election

Candidates
 Alva B. Adams, former U.S. Senator
 John T. Barnett, former Attorney General of Colorado

Results

Special election
Adams declined to be a candidate in the special election, and the state Democratic Party named Senator Walter Walker as its nominee.

Republican Primary

Regular election

Candidates
 Karl C. Schuyler, attorney
 Nate C. Warren, State Senator from Larimer County

Dropped out 
 John Foster Symes, Judge of the United States District Court for the District of Colorado

Campaign
Senator Waterman's announcement that he would not seek re-election triggered an open Republican contest for the nomination to replace him. Nate C. Warren emerged as a leading Republican candidate, and federal judge John Foster Symes, upon the urging of the state Republican establishment, also entered the race with the party's support. However, at the Republican convention, Denver-area Republicans encouraged Symes to drop out of the race in favor of attorney and party leader Karl C. Schuyler in an effort to defeat Warren. Both Schuyler and Warren won places on the September primary ballot, and Schuyler narrowly defeated Warren.

Results

Special election
The state Republican Party held off on naming its nominee for the special election until the primary for the regular election was settled. At that point, Schuyler was named as the nominee for the special election.

General election

Results

Regular election

Special election

References

1932
Colorado 1932
United States Senate 1932
Colorado
United States Senate